Ümit Karan (born October 1, 1976) is a Turkish football manager and former player who is currently the manager of Menemenspor.

He played for Gençlerbirliği S.K., Ankaraspor, Galatasaray and Eskişehirspor. He made his international debut for Turkey in 1999, and earned a total of 10 caps, scoring 3 goals.

Club career
After playing for Gençlerbirliği for 5 seasons and scoring 91 goals, Ümit moved to Galatasaray at the start of the 2001-02 season and was a key player in Mircea Lucescu's squad as the main striker after Mario Jardel's departure.

During the 2004-05 season, he was loaned to Ankaraspor by manager Gheorghe Hagi due to his dip in form.  However, Ümit made a strong return for the 2005-06 season with Galatasaray's new manager Eric Gerets.  Getting along well with Gerets and his playing style, Ümit scored 81 goals in 18 matches at the start of the season. But early in 2006, Umit's season was cut short by a knee injury, which kept him out of the game for 6 months.

At the start of the 2006-07 season, Ümit regained his place on the team after the injury layoff, scoring his 100th goal in the Süper Lig on September 18, 2006, against Beşiktaş.

Ümit has great finishing ability and he is usually in chase of sensational goals, particularly with volleys and bicycle kicks. His most sensational goal is arguably the one he scored against Vestel Manisaspor. Ümit latched onto a 40 meter pass just inside the box and struck a one time shot with his right foot and curled it around the helpless goalkeeper. He also possesses good pace, stamina and strength. He is also loved by the supporters, but he has had his share of problems with his former Galatasaray managers Fatih Terim and Gheorghe Hagi. On 24 June 2009 was fired from his 2010 contract with Galatasaray and he signed a contract with Eskisehirspor for 3 years.

Managerial career
On October 4, 2018, Karan accepted an offer to become the manager of FK Shkupi. He took over the team who were struggling to meet expectations and found themselves in 9th. His first game in charge was on 21 October 2018 which Shkupi won 2-1 against fellow underperformers, Sileks. During his first season in charge of the Skopje based club, he managed to achieve a 4th place finish in the league and thus secured a Europa League Qualifying slot. On August 26, 2019, Karan left his post as manager of Shkupi. His final game in charge was a 2-2 draw with Renova. On 30 September 2020, Karan re-joined Shkupi as manager on a one-year contract.

Career statistics

Honours
Gençlerbirliği
Turkish Cup: 2000–01

Galatasaray
Süper Lig: 2001–02, 2005–06, 2007–08

Individual
Turkish Cup Top Scorer: 2000–01

References

External links

 
Profile at TFF.org 

1976 births
Living people
Turkish footballers
Turkey international footballers
German footballers
German people of Turkish descent
Süper Lig players
Gençlerbirliği S.K. footballers
Ankaraspor footballers
Galatasaray S.K. footballers
Eskişehirspor footballers
Footballers from Berlin
Türkiyemspor Berlin players
Association football forwards
Turkish football managers
Survivor Turkey contestants